Charles Henry Dessalines d'Orbigny was a French botanist and geologist specializing in the Tertiary of France. He was the younger brother of French naturalist and South American explorer, Alcide d'Orbigny. At the National Museum of Natural History in Paris, d'Orbigny identified many of the flowering plant species returned to France from his brother's natural history collecting journeys through South America.

References

 
Botanists with author abbreviations
19th-century French botanists
1806 births
1876 deaths
Burials at Père Lachaise Cemetery